Keskisuomalainen Osakunta (KSO) is one of the 15 student nations at the University of Helsinki, Finnish-speaking and established in 1931.

References

External links